Napoli milionaria is an opera in three acts composed by Nino Rota to an Italian libretto by Eduardo De Filippo based on his 1945  that was also made into the 1950 play Side Street Story. Conducted by Bruno Bartoletti, the opera premiered at the Teatro Caio Melisso in Spoleto on 22 June 1977 as part of the Festival dei Due Mondi.

References

Operas by Nino Rota
Italian-language operas
Operas set in Italy
Operas based on plays
1977 operas
Operas